Hakea anadenia is a shrub in the family Proteaceae, native to near the west coast of Western Australia. The  fragrant creamy-white flowers  appear in profusion from late winter to spring, but do not produce nectar.

Description
Smaller branches are smooth with grey bark and have flattened soft  colourless hairs at flowering. Leaves are narrowly oval to egg-shaped and shallowly concave with one to three prominent longitudinal veins. Leaves are toothed with a sharp point. There are one or two inflorescence per axil with 14 to 20 flowers on each raceme. Flowers are devoid of a nectar-producing gland. The pedicels are smooth. Dense clusters of cream-white to pink fragrantly scented flowers appear from July to October.

Taxonomy and naming
Hakea anadenia was first formally described by Robyn Barker, L.Haegi, W.Barker and A.Wilson in 1999 and published in Flora of Australia.

Distribution and habitat
Hakea anadenia has a scattered distribution and is endemic to an area in the Wheatbelt region of Western Australia from around Dandaragan in the north to Williams in the south. Grows in sandy or gravelly soils over or around laterite usually in scrub-heath communities, also in mallee or low woodland areas.

Uses in horticulture 
A showy small shrub  both drought and frost tolerant. Grows well in an open and sunny situation in well-drained soil. Although it doesn't produce nectar as a food source for wildlife it does provide good protection due to its prickly growth habit.

Conservation status
Hakea anadenia is classified as "not threatened" by the Western Australian Government Department of Parks and Wildlife.

References

anadenia
Eudicots of Western Australia
Plants described in 1999